Harry Charles Clarke (December 1, 1916 – December 31, 2005) was a professional American football halfback for four seasons for the Chicago Bears in the National Football League.  He later played three seasons in the All-America Football Conference.  He played college football for West Virginia Mountaineers.

College career
Harry Clarke set many records while playing for West Virginia University.  He still holds some to this day.  While at WVU Clarke rushed for 921 yards, which was a team record at the time, in the 1938 season. He was inducted into the university's hall of fame in 1977.

Professional career
During his rookie season with the Chicago Bears, Clarke scored two touchdowns in the 1940 NFL Championship Game to help defeat the Washington Redskins 73–0.

After his fourth season with the Bears, Clarke was drafted into the Navy in 1943.  After his time in the service, Clarke played in the All-American Football Conference from 1946-1948 for Los Angeles Dons, then returned to Chicago to play for the Rockets.  According to some statistics, Clarke played for both the Dons and the Rockets in the 1948 season: 5 games for each team.

References

External links

1916 births
2005 deaths
Sportspeople from Cumberland, Maryland
American football running backs
West Virginia Mountaineers football players
Chicago Bears players
Los Angeles Dons players
Chicago Rockets players
United States Navy personnel of World War II